Pif or PIF may refer to:

Arts, media entertainment 
 International Puppet Festival, Zagreb, Croatia
 P.I.F. (band), a Bulgarian rock band
 Pif (television host), Italian television host named Pierfrancesco Diliberto
 Pif le chien, a French comic strip character
 Pif gadget, a French monthly comics magazine formed around the above character
 Public information film, a series of government-commissioned short films

Government and politics 
 Pacific Islands Forum
 Presidential Innovation Fellows
 Punjab Irregular Force
 Liberation Front of the Slovene Nation, also known as the Anti-Imperialist Front
 Public Investment Fund, Saudi Arabia's sovereign wealth fund

Science, engineering and technology 
 Path integral formulation, an approach to quantum mechanics
 PCF Interframe Space
 Pingelapese language
 Powder infant formula
 Poznań International Fair
 Pressure-injected footing
 Program information file
 Prolactin inhibiting factor
 Proteolysis-inducing factor

Other uses
 Paid in full (disambiguation)
 Palestine Investment Fund
 Panellinios IF
 Pargas Idrottsförening
 Partners in Flight
 Pay it forward (disambiguation)
 Pingtung Airport (IATA code: PIF)
 Pooled income fund
 Pusan International Forum (PIF)